Stockton is an unincorporated community in Jefferson Township, Owen County, in the U.S. state of Indiana.

History
Stockton was laid out in 1852. A post office was established at Stockton in 1855, and remained in operation until it was discontinued in 1877.

Geography

References

Unincorporated communities in Owen County, Indiana
Unincorporated communities in Indiana